The Glasair I, originally built as the prototype Glasair TD taildragger, is a high-performance homebuilt aircraft built of fiberglass. Created by Tom Hamilton as a fast, two-seat kitplane, the Glasair TD was derived from the earlier Tom Hamilton Glasair and first flew in 1979. Hamilton formed Stoddard-Hamilton Aircraft that year to produce and market the kit, which was the first pre-molded composite aircraft available to builders. It was introduced to the public at the 1980 EAA Convention in Oshkosh, Wisconsin, winning Hamilton the 1985 EAA August Raspet Award for "significant advancements in the field of light aircraft design".

Specifications (Glasair 1 )

References

Homebuilt aircraft
Glasair I
Glasair I